Brendan Anthony John Reilly  (born 23 December 1972 in Shipley, West Yorkshire) is a retired two-time Olympic high jumper.

Athletics career
Reilly won medals at the 1992 IAAF World Cup in Cuba and bronze at the 1995 Summer Universiade. 5 times English Schools Champion, former world record holder for 15 year olds (2.12 m), five times British Senior Champion, European and World Schools Champion. Broke the British junior record at 17 with 2m 27 cm in May 1990. First British teenager to jump over 2.30 m and a personal best of 2.32 m.

He represented England in the high jump event, at the 1994 Commonwealth Games in Victoria, British Columbia, Canada. Four years later he represented England in the high jump again, at the 1998 Commonwealth Games in Kuala Lumpur, Malaysia.

His personal bests in the event are 2.31 metres outdoors (1992) and 2.32 metres indoors (2000).

Personal life
Reilly is married to Irish Olympic sprinter Sarah Reilly.

He is also an artist with work on display for the Art of the Olympians (AOTO).

Competition record

References

External links
 Official website
 

1972 births
Living people
Sportspeople from Shipley, West Yorkshire
Irish male high jumpers
British male high jumpers
Olympic athletes of Ireland
Olympic athletes of Great Britain
Athletes (track and field) at the 1992 Summer Olympics
Athletes (track and field) at the 2000 Summer Olympics
Commonwealth Games competitors for England
Athletes (track and field) at the 1994 Commonwealth Games
Athletes (track and field) at the 1998 Commonwealth Games
World Athletics Championships athletes for Ireland
Universiade medalists in athletics (track and field)
Universiade bronze medalists for Great Britain
Medalists at the 1995 Summer Universiade